Phyllotreta is a genus of flea beetles in the family Chrysomelidae. There are at least 300 described species worldwide.

Agricultural pests
Many species have been recorded as pests of millets and sorghum

See also
 List of Phyllotreta species

References

 Riley, Edward G., Shawn M. Clark, and Terry N. Seeno (2003). "Catalog of the leaf beetles of America north of Mexico (Coleoptera: Megalopodidae, Orsodacnidae and Chrysomelidae, excluding Bruchinae)". Coleopterists Society Special Publication no. 1, 290.

Further reading

 Arnett, R. H. Jr., M. C. Thomas, P. E. Skelley and J. H. Frank. (eds.). (21 June 2002). American Beetles, Volume II: Polyphaga: Scarabaeoidea through Curculionoidea. CRC Press LLC, Boca Raton, Florida .
 
 Richard E. White. (1983). Peterson Field Guides: Beetles. Houghton Mifflin Company.

External links

 NCBI Taxonomy Browser, Phyllotreta

Alticini
Chrysomelidae genera
Insect pests of millets
Taxa named by Louis Alexandre Auguste Chevrolat